The Africa Women's Handball Championship for Clubs Winner's Cup is an annual international women's handball club competition run by the African Handball Confederation. The club sides from Africa's handball women's cup's winners in each African country are invited to participate in this competition.

Summary 
{| class="wikitable" style="font-size:90%; width: 98%; text-align: center;"
|- bgcolor=#C1D8FF
!rowspan=2 width=5%|Year
!rowspan=2 width=8%|Host
!width=1% rowspan=40 bgcolor=ffffff|
!colspan=3|Final
!width=1% rowspan=37 bgcolor=ffffff|
!colspan=3|Third place match
|- bgcolor=#EFEFEF
!width=17%|Champion
!width=6%|Score
!width=17%|Second place
!width=17%|Third place
!width=6%|Score
!width=17%|Fourth place
|- bgcolor=#fff0ff
|1985Details
|Port Said
|align=right|Grasshoppers of Owerri 
| – 
|align=left| SC Heliopolis
|colspan=3| Olympic SC Alexandria
|- bgcolor=#FFD4E4
|1986Details
|Cotonou
|align=right|AS Cami Toyota 
| – 
|align=left| Grasshoppers of Owerri
|colspan=3| Njanja Lubumbashi
|- bgcolor=#fff0ff
|1987Details
|Cairo
|align=right|Camship 
| – 
|align=left| US AGIP Pointe-Noire
|align=right|SC Heliopolis 
| – 
|align=left| Al Ahly SC
|- bgcolor=#FFD4E4
|1988Details
|Oran
|align=right|Camship 
| – 
|align=left| AS CNPS Yaoundé
|align=right|Club Africain 
| – 
|align=left| MP Oran HB
|- bgcolor=#fff0ff
|1989Details
|Cairo
|align=right|Camship 
| – 
|align=left| CARA Brazzaville
|align=right|AS CNPS Yaoundé 
| – 
|align=left| ASEC Mimosas
|- bgcolor=#FFD4E4
|1990Details
|Rabat
|align=right|Camship 
| – 
|align=left| CNPS Yaoundé
|align=right|CARA Brazzaville 
| – 
|align=left| Zaoui Meubles Sports
|- bgcolor=#fff0ff
|1991Details
|Algiers
|align=right|Desert Queens 
| – 
|align=left| Nadit Alger
|align=right|Africa Sports National 
| – 
|align=left| UCO Sport
|- bgcolor=#FFD4E4
|1992Details
|Bauchi
|align=right|Africa Sports National 
| – 
|align=left| Desert Queens
|align=right|UCO Sport 
| – 
|align=left| Top Lines Sparrow
|- bgcolor=#fff0ff
|1993Details
|Cairo
|align=right|Africa Sports National 
| – 
|align=left| UCO Sport
|align=right|Al Ahly SC 
| – 
|align=left| AS St Gilles
|- bgcolor=#FFD4E4
|1994Details
|Rabat
|align=right|Africa Sports National 
| – 
|align=left| IRB Alger
|align=right|AS Sogara 
| – 
|align=left| COS MUVE
|- bgcolor=#fff0ff
|1995Details
|Niamey
|align=right|Africa Sports National 
| – 
|align=left| Inter Club Brazzaville
|align=right|MC Alger HB 
| – 
|align=left| Sporting Cabinda
|- bgcolor=#FFD4E4
|1996Details
|Meknes
|align=right|Africa Sports National 
| – 
|align=left| Banco Sport
|align=right|Electro do Lobito 
| – 
|align=left| HC Nuru
|- bgcolor=#fff0ff
|1997Details
|Kano
|align=right|Africa Sports National 
| – 
|align=left| Grasshoppers of Owerri
|colspan=3| Valiants Abia
|- bgcolor=#FFD4E4
|1998Details
|Bauchi
|align=right|Africa Sports National 
| – 
|align=left| Étoile du Congo
|align=right|AS CNPS Yaoundé 
| – 
|align=left| Desert Queens
|- bgcolor=#fff0ff
|1999Details
|Algiers
|align=right|MC Alger HB 
| – 
|align=left| OC Alger
|align=right|RIJ Alger 
| – 
|align=left| Inter Club Brazzaville
|- bgcolor=#FFD4E4
|2000Details
|Bauchi
|align=right|Africa Sports National 
| – 
|align=left| AS CNPS Yaoundé
|colspan=3| Yankari Babes
|- bgcolor=#fff0ff
|2001Details
|Meknes
|align=right|Africa Sports National 
| – 
|align=left| MC Alger HB
|align=right|RAC Abidjan 
| – 
|align=left| AS CNPS Yaoundé
|- bgcolor=#FFD4E4
|2002Details
|Yamoussoukro
|align=right|Rombo Sport Kpouebo 
| – 
|align=left| Inter Club Brazzaville
|align=right|RAC Abidjan 
| – 
|align=left| AS CNPS Yaoundé
|- bgcolor=#fff0ff
|2003Details
|Tunis
|align=right|MC Alger HB 
| – 
|align=left| RAC Abidjan
|align=right|Tonnerre CK Yaoundé 
| – 
|align=left| Inter Club Brazzaville
|- bgcolor=#FFD4E4
|2004Details
|Tunis
|align=right|Rombo Sport Kpouebo 
| – 
|align=left| ASFS Tunis
|align=right|Tonnerre CK Yaoundé 
| – 
|align=left| HC Heritage
|- bgcolor=#fff0ff
|2005Details
|Fes
|align=right|Rombo Sport Kpouebo 
| – 
|align=left| Inter Club Brazzaville
|align=right|CARA Brazzaville 
| – 
|align=left| TP Mazembe
|- bgcolor=#FFD4E4
|2006Details
|Abidjan
|align=right|Rombo Sport Kpouebo 
| – 
|align=left| Inter Club Brazzaville
|align=right|Africa Sports National 
| – 
|align=left| CARA Brazzaville
|- bgcolor=#fff0ff
|2007Details
|Mahdia
|align=right|Inter Club Brazzaville 
| – 
|align=left| ABO Sport
|align=right|Rombo Sport Kpouebo 
| – 
|align=left| ASA
|- bgcolor=#FFD4E4
|2008Details
|Meknes
|align=right|Petro de Luanda 
| – 
|align=left| Tonnerre CK Yaoundé
|align=right|GS Pétroliers 
| – 
|align=left| Rombo Sport Kpouebo
|- bgcolor=#fff0ff
|2009Details
|Cotonou
|align=right|Petro de Luanda 
| – 
|align=left| Tonnerre CK Yaoundé
|align=right|Rombo Sport Kpouebo 
| – 
|align=left| FAP Yaoundé
|- bgcolor=#FFD4E4
|2010Details
|Ouagadougou
|align=right|Petro de Luanda 
|32–21
|align=left| FAP Yaoundé
|align=right|GS Pétroliers 
| – 
|align=left| ABO Sport
|- bgcolor=#fff0ff
|2011Details
|Yaoundé
|align=right|Petro de Luanda 
|32–20
|align=left| FAP Yaoundé
|align=right|Tonnerre CK Yaoundé 
|
|align=left| ASEL Brazzaville
|- bgcolor=#FFD4E4
|2012Details
|Tunis
|align=right|Petro de Luanda 
|
|align=left| Africa Sports National
|align=right|HC Héritage 
|
|align=left| ES Rejiche
|- bgcolor=#fff0ff
|2013Details
|Hammamet
|align=right|Petro de Luanda 
|37–32
|align=left| Inter Club Brazzaville
|align=right|HC Héritage 
|26–24
|align=left| FAP Yaoundé
|- bgcolor=#FFD4E4
|2014Details
|Oyo
|align=right|Petro de Luanda 
|30–21
|align=left| FAP Yaoundé
|align=right|Progresso 
|22–21
|align=left| ABO Sport
|- bgcolor=#fff0ff
|2015Details
|Libreville
|align=right|Primeiro de Agosto 
|36–22
|align=left| Africa Sports National
|align=right|ABO Sport 
|36–29
|align=left| FAP Yaoundé
|- bgcolor=#FFD4E4
|2016Details
|Laayoune
|align=right|Primeiro de Agosto 
|40–16
|align=left| TKC
|align=right|Progresso 
|33–30
|align=left| FAP Yaoundé
|- bgcolor=#fff0ff
|2017Details
|Agadir
|align=right|Primeiro de Agosto 
|24–16
|align=left| FAP Yaoundé
|align=right|CARA Brazzaville 
|27–16
|align=left| HC Vainqueur
|- bgcolor=#FFD4E4
|2018Details
|Cairo
|align=right|Petro de Luanda 
|23–19
|align=left| Primeiro de Agosto
|align=right|FAP Yaoundé 
|28–21
|align=left| ABO Sport
|- bgcolor=#fff0ff
|2019Details
|Oujda
|align=right|Primeiro de Agosto 
|28–16
|align=left| Petro de Luanda
|align=right|DGSP Brazzaville 
|33–24
|align=left| FAP Yaoundé
|- bgcolor=#cfcfcf
|2020
|
|colspan=9|Canceled due to the COVID-19 pandemic
|- bgcolor=#cfcfcf
|2021
|
|colspan=9|Canceled
|- bgcolor=#FFD4E4
|2022Details
|Niamey
|align=right|Petro de Luanda 
|
|align=left| DGSP Brazzaville
!width=1% bgcolor=ffffff rowspan=1|
|align=right|FAP Yaoundé 
|
|align=left| Bandama HBC
|} Round-robin tournament.

Winners by club

Rq:GS Pétroliers (ex. MC Alger HB)OC Alger (ex. IRB Alger)''

Winners by country

Participation details

See also
 African Women's Handball Champions League
 African Women's Handball Super Cup
 African Women's Handball Championship

External links
 Men's & Women's Cup Winners' Cup history – cahbonline
 Tournament profile at goalzz.com

 
African Handball Confederation competitions
African handball club competitions
Women's sports competitions in Africa
Multi-national professional sports leagues